Phyllonorycter tribhuvani is a moth of the family Gracillariidae. It is known from Nepal.

Overview 
The wingspan is about 6.5 mm.

The larvae feed on Prunus cerasoides. They mine the leaves of their host plant. The mine has the form of a tentiformed blotch occurring upon the upper surface of the leaf, usually very much elongated along the middle vein or sometimes along the lateral vein of the leaf. The upper epidermis of the leaf on the mining part is whitish with minute, brown to blackish-brown spots, much constricted longitudinally, with a single large central ridge.

References

tribhuvani
Moths of Asia
Moths described in 1973